Marcel Sabourin, OC (born March 25, 1935) is a Canadian actor and writer from Quebec. He is most noted for his role as Abel Gagné, the central character in Jean Pierre Lefebvre's trilogy of Don't Let It Kill You (Il ne faut pas mourir pour ça), The Old Country Where Rimbaud Died (Le Vieux pays où Rimbaud est mort) and Now or Never (Aujourd'hui ou jamais), and his performance as Professor Mandibule in the children's television series Les Croquignoles and La ribouldingue.

Career
Sabourin launched his career in the 1950s with La Roulotte, a children's theatre troupe launched by Paul Buissonneau which performed in Montreal's public parks. He studied at Collège Sainte-Marie de Montréal and the Théâtre du Nouveau Monde, and in Paris under Jacques Lecoq. One of the most prolific performers in the history of the Cinema of Quebec, he has had film, television and stage credits since 1956.

He won a Canadian Film Award for Best Actor in a Non-Feature at the 25th Canadian Film Awards in 1973 for Des armes et les hommes, and was a two-time Canadian Film Award and Genie Award nominee for Best Actor, receiving nods at the 28th Canadian Film Awards in 1977 for J.A. Martin Photographer (J.A. Martin photographe) and at the 4th Genie Awards in 1983 for Sweet Lies and Loving Oaths (Doux aveux). As a screenwriter, he was nominated for Best Adapted Screenplay at the 1st Genie Awards in 1980, as cowriter with Jean Beaudin of the film Cordélia.

At Quebec's Jutra Awards, he was a two-time Best Actor nominee for Now or Never at the 1st Jutra Awards in 1999, and for Another House (L'Autre maison) at the  16th Jutra Awards in 2014, and was the recipient of the Jutra-Hommage lifetime achievement award in 1999.

As a playwright he is most noted for Pleurer pour rire, which won the Floyd S. Chalmers Canadian Play Award in the youth theatre division in 1983, and was shortlisted for the Governor General's Award for French-language drama at the 1984 Governor General's Awards.

He has also taught at the National Theatre School of Canada.

Personal life
He married his wife Françoise in the 1960s. They have had four children, including actor and screenwriter Gabriel Sabourin and cinematographer Jérôme Sabourin.

Filmography

Television

Film

References

External links
 
  Archives of Marcel Sabourin (Fonds Marcel Sabourin, R11801) are held at Library and Archives Canada

1935 births
Living people
20th-century Canadian male actors
20th-century Canadian screenwriters
20th-century Canadian male writers
20th-century Canadian dramatists and playwrights
21st-century Canadian male actors
21st-century Canadian screenwriters
21st-century Canadian male writers
21st-century Canadian dramatists and playwrights
Canadian male dramatists and playwrights
Canadian male screenwriters
Canadian male film actors
Canadian male television actors
Canadian male stage actors
Canadian dramatists and playwrights in French
Canadian screenwriters in French
Canadian songwriters
Canadian acting coaches
Canadian theatre directors
Canadian Screen Award winners
French Quebecers
Male actors from Montreal
Writers from Montreal
Officers of the Order of Canada